= Occupation of Afghanistan =

Occupation of Afghanistan may refer to various times in the country's history when it was occupied by a foreign power.

- Soviet occupation of Afghanistan - 1979-1989
- American occupation of Afghanistan - 2001–2021
